The Avalon East Senior Hockey League (AESHL) is a senior ice hockey league with teams based in Newfoundland and Labrador. It is one of two senior hockey leagues in Newfoundland; the other being the West Coast Senior Hockey League.

History

The Avalon East Senior Hockey League is a hockey league based in Newfoundland and Labrador. The League was created in 2003. The league ended in 2017. Now the new East Coast Senior Hockey League is the league

Teams

Former Teams
Mount Pearl Blades
Flatrock Flyers

League Champions

Regular Season champions

Playoff champions
2006 - Conception Bay North CeeBee Stars
2007 - Conception Bay North CeeBee Stars
2008 - Conception Bay North CeeBee Stars
2009 - Conception Bay North CeeBee Stars
2010 - Conception Bay North CeeBee Stars
2011 - Conception Bay North CeeBee Stars
2012 - St. John's Capitals
2013 - St. John's Capitals
2014 - St. John's Capitals
2015 - Southern Shore Breakers
2016 - St. John's Toyota Plaza Caps
2017 - CeeBee Stars

Herder Champions
2006 - Conception Bay North Cee Bee Stars
2007 - Conception Bay North Cee Bee Stars
2008 - Conception Bay North Cee Bee Stars
2017 - Conception Bay North Cee Bee Stars

External links 
 Avalon East Senior Hockey League (AESHL)

1
Senior ice hockey